( was a Byzantine court title used in the 10th and 11th centuries.

The title is first attested for the reign of Emperor John I Tzimiskes, when it was held by Nikephoros Phokas, son of the  Leo Phokas.

As with other titles of the middle Byzantine period, the prestige of  declined towards the end of the 11th century, when it is attested as being held by lower-ranking officials. Both titles, however, do not appear to have survived the reign of Emperor Alexios I Komnenos.

References

Sources

 

Byzantine court titles